Narendra Mohan Sen (1887–1963) was an Indian freedom fighter and revolutionary involved with Anushilan Samiti.

Short biography
Narendra joined the revolutionary outfit that was known as Anushilan Samiti. He played a major role in unifying Jugantar, led by Jadugopal Mukherjee and Anushilan Samiti in the 1920s, after both parties suffered major setback because most of their senior leaders were arrested.

References

Anushilan Samiti
1887 births
1963 deaths
Revolutionary movement for Indian independence
Indian revolutionaries